Burton Green is a village and civil parish in the Warwick district of the county of Warwickshire, England, some  northwest of Kenilworth (where the population can be found in Abbey Ward) and  southwest of Coventry. It is mostly residential, surrounded by farmland and has a village hall, a primary school and a pub-restaurant 'Hickory's Smokehouse', formerly The Peeping Tom pub. The civil parish was created from part of Stoneleigh on 2 April 2012. It is situated directly on the border with southwestern Coventry and is contiguous with the city's Westwood Heath district, and borders the Metropolitan Borough of Solihull to the northwest. Burton Green comprises four roads: Red Lane, Hob Lane, Hodgetts Lane and Cromwell Lane. There is a disused water tower off Cromwell Lane, which has now been converted into a luxury private home.

High Speed 2
The route for the currently under construction high-speed rail line High Speed 2, from London to Birmingham, will run underneath the centre of Burton Green in a  tunnel, reusing a disused rail route that is currently a Greenway. The village hall, which lies in the path of the new railway, is due to be demolished and replaced with a new facility in a different location.

References

External links

 Website devoted to Burton Green
 Village Hall website
 Proposed route for High Speed 2 rail line

Villages in Warwickshire
Civil parishes in Warwickshire
Warwick District